75th parallel may refer to:

75th parallel north, a circle of latitude in the Northern Hemisphere
75th parallel south, a circle of latitude in the Southern Hemisphere